Graphium levassori, the yellow lady, is a species of butterfly in the family Papilionidae. It is endemic to the Comoros.

Description
The greater part of the wings above is yellowish white, but the following parts are black: the costal margin of the forewing as far as the cell and on the hindwing the apex, which is 
adorned with two light spots in cellules 7 and 8, and a marginal line, only 1 mm broad between vein 5 and the hinder angle, which is somewhat widened at the apical angle and there encloses two light spots. — Great Comoro.

Taxonomy
It is a member of the  leonidas-group of closely species (Graphium leonidas, Graphium levassori, Graphium cyrnus).

References

Sources
 IUCN Red List of all current Threatened Species 

levassori
Endemic fauna of the Comoros
Butterflies of Africa
Endangered animals
Endangered biota of Africa
Butterflies described in 1890
Taxonomy articles created by Polbot
Lepidoptera of the Comoros